Penicillaria is a genus of moths of the family Euteliidae. The genus was erected by Achille Guenée in 1852.

Species
Penicillaria aureiplaga (Bethune-Baker, 1906) New Guinea
Penicillaria dinawa Bethune-Baker, 1906 New Guinea
Penicillaria dinawaensis (Bethune-Baker, 1906) New Guinea
Penicillaria dorsipuncta (Hampson, 1912) Singapore, Sundaland - New Guinea, Queensland
Penicillaria ethiopica (Hampson, 1920) South Africa
Penicillaria jocosatrix Guenée, 1852 Indo-Australian tropics, Hawaii (introduced)
Penicillaria ludatrix Walker, 1858 Sri Lanka
Penicillaria lineatrix Walker, 1858 Canara
Penicillaria maculata Butler, 1889 Oriental tropics, Sundaland, New Caledonia, Vanuatu
Penicillaria magnifica (Robinson, 1975) Fiji
Penicillaria meeki Bethune-Baker, 1906 Peninsular Malaysia, Sumatra, Borneo, New Guinea, Bismarcks, Solomons, Fiji, Samoa
Penicillaria nigriplaga (Warren, 1914) New Guinea
Penicillaria nugatrix Guenée, 1852 India
Penicillaria plusioides (Walker, 1862) Oriental tropics, Sundaland, Bismarcks
Penicillaria pratti (Bethune-Baker, 1906) New Guinea
Penicillaria regalis (Prout, 1921) Amboina
Penicillaria rothschildi (Warren, 1914) New Guinea
Penicillaria simplex (Walker, 1865) Oriental tropics - New Guinea, Kuangtung

References

Euteliinae